Mnet, or M-net may refer to:

Entertainment
 , a German internet service provider.
 M-Net, a South-African-based African subscription-funded television channel and company
 M-Net Series, a defunct TV channel broadcast on the South African satellite television service DStv
 M-Net Movies, a group of film television channels broadcast in Sub-Saharan Africa on DStv & GOtv
 M-Net City, a television channel on the South African satellite television service DStv
 Mnet, a name used by the CJ Group for the following brands owned by it:
 Mnet (TV channel), a South Korean music television channel
 Mnet Media, a South Korean entertainment company under the CJ group

Other uses
 Mnet (peer-to-peer network)
 MNET (interbank network), a Pakistani operator of inter-bank connectivity platform
 m.Net Corporation, an Australian telecommunications company
 MNet, the former credit card division of MCorp, now part of Bank One